St. Joseph Cemetery, St. Joseph's Catholic Cemetery or variants may refer to:

Old St. Joseph's Cemetery (Cincinnati, Ohio)
New St. Joseph Cemetery (Cincinnati, Ohio)
St. Joseph Catholic Church (Camp Springs, Kentucky) 
St. Joseph Cemetery (Fleming, New York)
St. Joseph Cemetery (Manchester, New Hampshire)
St. Joseph's Catholic Church (Palm Bay, Florida)
St. Joseph Cemetery (River Grove, Illinois)
St. Joseph Cemetery (Swedesboro, New Jersey)
St. Joseph Cemetery (West Roxbury, Massachusetts)

See also
St. Joseph's Catholic Church (disambiguation)